Prettyman may refer to:

People
Alfred Prettyman (born 1935), American publisher
E. Barrett Prettyman (1891–1971), United States federal judge
E. Barrett Prettyman Jr. (1925–2016), American lawyer
Elijah Barrett Prettyman (1830–1907), the second principal of Maryland State Normal School (now Towson University)
Horace Greely Prettyman (1857–1945), American football player in the early years of the sport
Tristan Prettyman (born 1982), singer-songwriter and former Roxy model from San Diego, California

Places

Other
Bel Ami (TV series) (also known as Pretty Man), South Korean romantic comedy television series
Pretty Woman, 1990 romantic comedy film
Pretty Boy (disambiguation)
Pretty Girl (disambiguation)